Marco Onofrio (born February 11, 1971) is an Italian writer, essayist and literary critic. In 1995 he graduated with honors in contemporary Italian literature from the University of Rome "La Sapienza", defending a Laurea dissertation on the poet Dino Campana, which was awarded the 'Eugenio Montale' European Prize in 1996. His work deals primarily with modern and contemporary Italian literature, with special emphasis on the twentieth century writers. He studies the relationship of Italian and foreign writers with the city of Rome, and the impact of staying in or visiting Rome in their work. He also carries out activities of militant criticism aimed at the discovery and advancement of new editorial proposals. He has published several volumes of poetry and fiction, written dozens of prefaces and authored hundreds of articles in various Italian newspapers, including "Il Messaggero", "Il Tempo", "Lazio Ieri e Oggi", "Studium", "Nuova Antologia", "La Voce Romana", "L'Immaginazione", "Orlando". Among the works of fiction, he published the experimental novel "Senza cuore" (2012), the satirical tales "La scuola degli idioti" (2013), "ENERGIE" (2016), "Specchio doppio" (2022) and the emotional novel "Diario di un padre innamorato" (2016) focused on the experience of fatherhood and dedicated to his daughter Valentina. With his dramatic poem "Emporium. Poemetto di civile indignazione" he has anticipated - three years before the pamphlet "Indignez-vous!" (2011) by Stéphane Hessel - the movement of the "Indignados". Drawing inspiration from the poems of "La presenza di Giano", the musician Marcello Appignani has composed the songs collected in the album "Natura viva con oboe, chitarra e violoncello", published by RAI Trade in September 2014.

Awards
 2009: Carver Prize for "Ungaretti e Roma" 
 2011: Farina Prize for "Emporium. Poemetto di civile indignazione" 
 2012: Di Liegro International Prize for the poem "Mito" 
 2013: Pannunzio Prize for "Nello specchio del racconto. L'opera narrativa di Antonio Debenedetti"
 2013: Città di Torino Prize for "Ora è altrove" 
 2013: Città di Sassari International Prize for "Ora è altrove"
 2016: Simpatia Prize for his work as a writer and cultural activities
 2020: EquiLibri Prize for "Anatomia del vuoto"
 2021: Tulliola-Renato Filippelli World Prize for "Anatomia del vuoto"
 2021: Antica Pyrgos International Prize for "Azzurro esiguo"

Volumes of essays and literary criticism 
"Guido De Carolis. Pittura Luce Energia" (2007).
"Ungaretti e Roma" (2008).
"Dentro del cielo stellare. La poesia orfica di Dino Campana" (2010).
"Nello specchio del racconto. L’opera narrativa di Antonio Debenedetti" (2011).
"Non possiamo non dirci romani. La Città Eterna nello sguardo di chi l’ha vista, vissuta e scritta" (2013).
"Come dentro un sogno. La narrativa di Dante Maffìa tra realtà e surrealismo mediterraneo" (2014).
"Giorgio Caproni e Roma" (2015).
"Il graffio della piuma. Poetesse italiane fuori dal coro (2006-2016)" (2017).
"Roma vince sempre. Scrittori Personaggi Storie Atmosfere" (2018).
"I Castelli Romani nella penna degli scrittori" (2018).
"La trilogia di Lina Raus. Dalla psiche al benessere sociale" (2019).
"Novecento e oltre. Letteratura italiana di ieri e di oggi" (2020).
"Le segrete del Parnaso. Caste letterarie in Italia" (2020).
"Le ali della Terra. Altre poetesse italiane fuori dal "coro" (2009-2019)" (2021).
"L'officina del mondo. La scrittura poetica di Dante Maffìa" (2021).

Volumes of poetry
 "Squarci d’eliso" (2002)
 "Autologia" (2005)
 "D’istruzioni" (2006)
 "Antebe. Romanzo d’amore in versi" (2007)
 "È giorno" (2007)
 "Emporium. Poemetto di civile indignazione" (2008)
 "La presenza di Giano" (2010)
 "Disfunzioni" (2011)
 "Ora è altrove" (2013)
 "Ai bordi di un quadrato senza lati" (2015)
 "La nostalgia dell’infinito" (2016)
 "Le catene del sole" (2019)
 "Anatomia del vuoto" (2019)
 "Azzurro esiguo" (2021)

References

1971 births
Living people
21st-century Italian male writers
Sapienza University of Rome alumni
Italian literary critics
21st-century Italian poets